is a railway station on the Keikyu Zushi Line in Zushi, Kanagawa, Japan, operated by the private railway operator Keikyu.

Lines
Zushi·Hayama Station is the southern terminus of the Keikyu Zushi Line, and is located 5.9 km from the junction at Kanazawa-hakkei Station, and 46.8 km from Shinagawa Station in Tokyo.

Station layout
Zushi·Hayama Station has a single side platform serving bi-directional traffic.

Platforms

History
Zushi·Hayama Station opened on 2 February 1985.

The name was changed to reflect the station's location near Hayama, a popular commuter and seaside resort town.

Keikyū introduced station numbering to its stations on 21 October 2010; Zushi·Hayama Station was assigned station number KK53.

Passenger statistics
In fiscal 2011, the station was used by an average of 22,990 passengers daily.

Surrounding area
 Zushi Station (JR East Yokosuka Line)
 Zushi City Office
 Zushi Kaisei Junior & Senior High School
 Seimaria Primary School

References

External links

 Keikyu station information 

Keikyū Zushi Line
Railway stations in Kanagawa Prefecture
Railway stations in Japan opened in 1985